The 2007–08 season was Leicester City's 103rd season in the English football league system and their 57th in the second tier of English football.

Season summary
Martin Allen had joined Leicester from Milton Keynes Dons in May, but his refusal to sign Dutch striker Jimmy Floyd Hasselbaink, who had been invited for a medical by chairman Milan Mandarić but turned away by Allen, created friction between the two. The tension was only exacerbated when Allen refused to put in a bid for Celtic striker Derek Riordan. Eventually Martin Allen left Leicester by mutual consent on 29 August, after three months and four matches in charge, with Leicester in ninth place. Former West Bromwich Albion and Nottingham Forest manager Gary Megson was appointed as Allen's successor on 13 September, but left 41 days later, signing as Bolton Wanderers manager on 24 October, leaving Leicester 15th after nine league matches in charge. Ian Holloway, who had stabilised Plymouth Argyle in the Championship, was named Megson's successor on 22 November, but he was unable to revitalise Leicester and a 0–0 draw at Stoke City and with Southampton (who started the day in the relegation zone) beating Sheffield United on the final day of the season sealed Leicester's relegation to the third tier. Holloway left the club by mutual consent on 23 May.

Kit and sponsorship
Leicester City's last deal with kit supplier JJB Sports came to an end on 9 May 2007. It was announced on 30 May that Topps Tiles would be the kits sponsor in a two-year agreement. On 26 June it was announced the new kit would be produced by Jako and would be an all blue kit. The last time Leicester City wore an all-blue kit was during the promotion season of 2002–03.

Final league table

Club standings

Results
Leicester City's score comes first

Legend

Football League Championship

FA Cup

League Cup

Squad

Left club during season

Transfers In

Summer

Winter

Transfers out

Summer

Winter

Awards

Club awards
At the end of the season, Leicester's annual award ceremony, including categories voted for by the players and backroom staff, the supporters and the supporters club, saw the following players recognised for their achievements for the club throughout the 2007–08 season.

References

Leicester City F.C. seasons
Leicester City